The 2019–20 Mercer Bears men's basketball team represented Mercer University in the 2019–20 NCAA Division I men's basketball season. The Bears, led by first-year head coach Greg Gary, played their home games at Hawkins Arena in Macon, Georgia, as members of the Southern Conference. They finished the season 17–15, 11–7 in SoCon play to finish in fourth place. They lost in the quarterfinals of the SoCon tournament to Western Carolina.

Previous season
The Bears finished the 2018–19 season 11–20 overall, 6–12 in SoCon play to finish in a tie for sixth place. In the SoCon tournament, they were defeated by Furman in the first round.

On March 11, 2019, it was announced that head coach Bob Hoffman was fired. On March 26, Purdue assistant Greg Gary was announced as Mercer's next head coach.

Roster

Schedule and results

|-
!colspan=12 style=| Exhibition

|-
!colspan=12 style=| Regular season

|-
!colspan=12 style=| SoCon tournament
|-

|-

Source

References

Mercer Bears men's basketball seasons
Mercer Bears
Mercer Bears men's basketball
Mercer Bears men's basketball